Robert Bruce Clotworthy (born October 24, 1955) is an American actor and voice actor. A narrator, he is best known as the narrator for the History Channel series Ancient Aliens and The Curse of Oak Island and his role as the voice of Jim Raynor in the StarCraft video game series.

Career

Early career
Clotworthy's career as a voice actor began when he was fifteen. "My father was a producer of radio commercials and from an early age I would accompany him to recording sessions. I met some of the finest voice talent (Jerry Stiller, Anne Meara, Mel Blanc, June Foray etc.) and they inspired me."

Role as Jim Raynor
Clotworthy starred as the voice of Jim Raynor in the StarCraft series of real-time strategy video games. Clotworthy first appeared as Raynor in StarCraft, in which Raynor was a major character heavily involved in the game's storyline. He reprised his role in the expansion StarCraft: Brood War. A reader's poll for GameSpot voted Raynor one of video gaming's top ten heroes, with GameSpot giving specific praise to the quality of Clotworthy's voice acting.

Twelve years after the release of StarCraft, Clotworthy reprised his role as Raynor in StarCraft II: Wings of Liberty. The storyline of Wings of Liberty focuses primarily on the Terrans and Raynor in particular, with Raynor taking the role of main character. A review of Wings of Liberty on ITP.net stated that Raynor was "voiced to perfection" by Clotworthy and he was selected as the winner of "GotY Awards 2010 – Best Voice Acting" by reactiontime.co.uk. Clotworthy returned to the role with the expansions StarCraft II: Heart of the Swarm and StarCraft II: Legacy of the Void, as well as Blizzard's crossover video game Heroes of the Storm.

Other roles
Clotworthy has worked in over 100 feature films and television programs. He appeared as "Forensic Technician" in four episodes of the 1980s US TV series Hunter. Clotworthy was the narrator on the Emmy nominated documentaries Empire of Dreams: The Making of the Star Wars Trilogy and Star Wars: The Legacy Revealed. Clotworthy even worked on The Lego Movie Videogame. Clotworthy also narrated Indiana Jones and the Ultimate Quest and Batman Unmasked: The Psychology of the Dark Knight. Clotworthy has guest starred on The Big Bang Theory, Two and a Half Men and on China, IL. In 2014, Clotworthy voiced the Espheni (referred to as "The Monk") in the TNT series Falling Skies, and made an on-screen appearance in American Sniper as a Veteran Affairs doctor who consults with Chris Kyle. Clotworthy also voiced the Black Knight/Zelgius and Finn in Nintendo's mobile title, Fire Emblem Heroes.

Filmography

Films

Television

Video Games

References

External links
Official website

Official page at Twitter
Official page at Facebook

Living people
American male film actors
American male soap opera actors
American male television actors
American male video game actors
American male voice actors
20th-century American male actors
21st-century American male actors
Year of birth missing (living people)
Place of birth missing (living people)